The VK 45.02 (P) was the official designation for an unsuccessful heavy tank project designed by Ferdinand Porsche in Nazi Germany during World War II to compete with Henschel's design.

Development of this vehicle started in April 1942, with two design variants (Ausf. A and Ausf. B) incorporating different features. The Krupp company received an order for construction of 50 turrets. However, the prototype hull was never manufactured. The turrets were mounted on the first Tiger II's, which were supposed to be armed with a KwK L/71 gun, like its Henschel counterpart.

After the VK 45.01 (P) failed to win the contract, Ferdinand Porsche began looking at ways to improve the design for a future version. Based on the latest Allied tank designs, however, it was clear that simply increasing the armor on the VK 45.01 (P) would not be enough for the tank to remain competitive. It needed to have both more weight and more maneuverability. What initially began as a single vehicle, entitled "Typ 180" grew into a series of five different vehicles, requiring the development of two hull configurations: the Hinten with its turret at the back (as shown in the picture on top) and the Vorne with its turret on the front. Both an electric and a hydraulic drive system, and four different engines. The overall project came to be known as VK 45.02 (P).

References

World War II heavy tanks
World War II tanks of Germany
Heavy tanks of Germany